Washingtonia is a genus of palms, native to the southwestern United States (in southern California, and southwest Arizona) and northwest Mexico (in Baja California and Sonora).  Both Washingtonia species are commonly cultivated across the Southern United States, the Middle East, southern Europe, and North Africa, where they have greatly hybridized.

Description
They are fan palms (subfamily Coryphoideae), with   petioles armed with sharp thorns terminating in a rounded fan of numerous leaflets. The flowers are in a dense inflorescence, with the fruits maturing into a small blackish-brown drupe 6–10 mm diameter with a thin layer of sweet flesh over the single seed.

Extant species
There are three species: Washingtonia robusta, Washingtonia filifera, and Washingtonia filibusta

The fruit is edible, and was used by Native American people as a minor food source. They are also eaten by birds, which disperse the seeds in their droppings after digesting the fruit pulp. Washingtonia species are also used as food plants by the larvae of some Lepidoptera species, including Paysandisia archon.

Both species are cultivated as ornamental trees, widely planted in California, Florida, Texas, extreme southwest Utah, Arizona, southern New Mexico, South Carolina, and southern areas of North Carolina. It is also cultivated in the Mediterranean region in southern Europe and north Africa, parts of Australia, and the leeward sides of the Hawaiian Islands. W. filifera is modestly hardy in drier climate and able to survive brief temperatures in the vicinity of -15 °C (10 °F), provided the air and soil are not too wet, and the afternoon temperatures are not too cold. Intolerance of wet, prolonged cold is the main reason the filifera species cannot grow in temperate climates. W. robusta is less sensitive to moisture than filifera, but far more easily damaged by cold.

The genus is named after George Washington.

Image gallery

References

External links
Flickr: Washingtonias in Russian National Subtropical Garden
Flora of North America: Washingtonia
Scanpalm: Washingtonia
Washingtonia filifera: Native habitats in Arizona - reprinted from Principes, 34,(4), 1990, pp. 177-180

 
Arecaceae genera
Flora of North America